von Richter is a German surname. Notable people with the surname include:

Owen Von Richter (born 1975), Canadian swimmer
Victor von Richter (1841–1891), German chemist
Von Richter reaction

See also
Richter (surname)

German-language surnames